Janata Bank Nepal Limited was a commercial bank in Nepal. The bank was an ‘A’ class commercial bank licensed by Nepal Rastra Bank and had branches all across the nation with its head office in Kathmandu which provided a complete commercial banking service.

The bank's shares were publicly traded as an 'A' category company in the Nepal Stock Exchange.
The Bank has been merged with Global IME Bank Limited and since being operated with later name.

Correspondent Network
The bank had been maintaining harmonious correspondent relationships with various international banks from various countries to facilitate trade, remittance and other cross border services. Through these correspondents the bank was able to provide services in any major currencies in the world.

Merger agreement
Janata Bank signed an agreement with Global IME Bank Limited on 20th Asar 2076 according to which the name of bank will remains the same but the core members will be changed.

See also
 list of banks in Nepal
 Commercial Banks of Nepal

References

External links
 Official website of Janata Bank Nepal Limited
 Official website of Nepal Rastra Bank

Banks of Nepal
2010 establishments in Nepal